Kārlis Zāle (28 October 1888 – 19 February 1942) was a Latvian sculptor.

Zāle was born in Mažeikiai, but grew up in Liepāja. After training in Russia at the Kazan Art School under Alexander Matveyev and in Germany, he returned to Riga in 1923, where he both worked in sculpture and taught it. He is best known for his monumental sculptures, including the massive main gates at Brothers' Cemetery and the Freedom Monument in Riga.

He died in Inčukalns, Latvia.

Gallery

References
Footnotes

Sources
Apsitis, V., 1982 (3ed edn, 1993). Latvian Art in 1915–1940 (comp. I. Burane). Stockholm: Latvian State Academy of Arts.

External links

 Classic.Culture.lv: Short Biography
 "Brīvības Piemineklis" (Freedom Monument), published by the Freedom Monument Committee, 1935 (in Latvian, partially translated)

1888 births
1942 deaths
People from Mažeikiai
People from Telshevsky Uyezd
Latvian sculptors
20th-century Latvian artists
20th-century sculptors